Bound By the Beauty is a 1989 album by Jane Siberry. It received better reviews than her previous album, The Walking, and the title track received more extensive radio airplay than Siberry had seen since "One More Colour" in 1985.

The track "Half Angel Half Eagle" was controversial. Siberry used the images of an angel and an eagle soaring over a city to depict a view of both the beauty and the ugliness of city life; the ugliness was apparent in the lyric "fucking honky nigger Jew/WASP Jap dago fag/fucking homeless preacher dyke/cabbie fucking union scab". Siberry was commenting on the prevalence of this type of offensive language on the streets of a big city.

"Something About Trains" also appeared (as "This Old Earth") on The Top of His Head, the soundtrack to Peter Mettler's film The Top of His Head; the song was a Genie Award nominee for Best Original Song at the 11th Genie Awards in 1990.

Mettler also took the album's cover photograph.

Track listing 
All tracks written by Jane Siberry.
 "Bound by the Beauty" – 4:41
 "Something About Trains" – 3:44
 "Hockey" – 3:58
 "Everything Reminds Me of My Dog" – 4:17
 "The Valley" – 6:04
 "The Life Is the Red Wagon" – 4:12
 "Half Angel Half Eagle" – 3:55
 "La Jalouse" – 3:59
 "Miss Punta Blanca" – 1:38
 "Are We Dancing Now? (Map III)" – 6:11

Personnel 
 Jane Siberry – guitars, piano, vocals
 Teddy Borowiecki – piano, accordion
 Ken Myhr – guitars
 John Switzer – bass, vocals
 Stich Wynston – drums

Additional personnel 
 Wendell Ferguson – pedal steel guitar on 5
 David Piltch – acoustic bass on 8
 David Ramsden – vocals on 6, 7
 Rebecca Jenkins – vocals on 6, 7
 Anne Bourne – vocals on 6
 Gina Stepaniuk – vocals on 6
 Cherie Camp – vocals on 6
 Don Freed – vocals on 4

Charts 
Album

References 

Jane Siberry albums
1989 albums
Reprise Records albums
Duke Street Records albums